Danish singer and songwriter MØ has released three studio albums, three extended plays and thirteen singles, plus six as a featured artist.

On 14 January 2013 she released her debut single, "Glass". On 15 March 2013 she released "Pilgrim" with B-side "Maiden". It peaked at number eleven on the Danish Singles Chart. On 7 June 2013 she released the single "Waste of Time". On 30 August 2013 she released the single "XXX 88". MØ's first extended play, Bikini Daze was released on 18 October 2013. The single "Don't Wanna Dance" debuted on BBC Radio 1 on 16 January 2014 as Zane Lowe's Hottest Record. MØ's debut studio album, No Mythologies to Follow was released on 7 March 2014. In 2014, MØ was featured on Australian rapper Iggy Azalea's song "Beg for It", which was released as the lead single from Azalea's reissue album, Reclassified. MØ co-wrote and provided vocals for Major Lazer song "Lean On" with DJ Snake, which was released in March 2015. On 1 October 2015 it was announced that the first single from MØ's then-upcoming second studio album, "Kamikaze", produced by Diplo would be released on 15 October 2015. On 14 October the single made its world premiere on a BBC Radio segment hosted by Annie Mac before the studio version was released the following day. "Kamikaze" has charted in Denmark, the United Kingdom and Australia. 

On 13 May 2016, "Final Song" the second single from MØ's second album was released and also made its world premiere on the same radio segment hosted by Annie Mac. The song was co-written with Swedish singer-songwriter Noonie Bao and British singer-songwriter MNEK. It became MØ's first top 40 hit as a lead artist in the United Kingdom, with the song reaching number 15 on the UK Singles Chart. Additionally, the song became a top 40 hit in more than 10 countries worldwide. On 22 July 2016 American group Major Lazer released the single "Cold Water" which features Canadian singer Justin Bieber and MØ. It is the fourth time MØ has worked with Major Lazer. In the United States the song debuted at number two on the Billboard Hot 100, becoming MØ's second top 10 single and highest-charting single in the United States. In the United Kingdom the song debuted at number one on the UK Singles Chart. The song became MØ's first number-one single and she is only the fourth Danish act to reach number one in the UK. Additionally, it is the first time two Danish acts have reached number one in the same year (with the other being Lukas Graham's "7 Years").

Studio albums

Extended plays

Remix albums

Singles

As lead artist

As featured artist

Other charted songs

Songwriting credits

Guest appearances

Music videos

References

Notes

Sources

Discographies of Danish artists
Discography